Fine Gaedheal may refer to
 Fine Gael, Irish political party founded in 1932
 Fine Ghaedheal, organiser of the Irish Race Convention 1922